Lock, the Fox is an album by saxophonist Eddie "Lockjaw" Davis recorded in 1966 for the RCA Victor label.

Reception
The Allmusic site awarded the album 3 stars.

Track listing 
 "Nina Never Knew" (Louis Alter, Milton Drake) - 2:34
 "Speak Low" (Ogden Nash Kurt Weill) - 4:01
 "Midnight Sun" (Sonny Burke, Lionel Hampton, Johnny Mercer) - 3:50
 "On Green Dolphin Street" (Bronisław Kaper, Ned Washington) - 3:42
 "Save Your Love for Me" (Buddy Johnson) - 3:11
 "On a Clear Day (You Can See Forever)" (Burton Lane, Alan Jay Lerner) - 3:23
 "West Coast Blues" (Wes Montgomery) - 4:06
 "Days of Wine and Roses" (Henry Mancini, Johnny Mercer) - 3:21
 "The Good Life" (Sacha Distel) - 3:39
 "Oh!! Gee!!" (Matthew Gee) - 3:03

Personnel 
 Eddie "Lockjaw" Davis - tenor saxophone
 Ross Tompkins - piano
 Les Spann - guitar
 Russell George - bass
 Chuck Lampkin - drums
 Ray Barretto - congas

References 

Eddie "Lockjaw" Davis albums
1966 albums
RCA Victor albums